Smyk is a brand of Polish retail chain selling products for infants and children up to the age of 14, including clothing, footwear, toys, school stationery and other accessories. There are more than 220 Smyk stores in Poland and almost 40 together in Ukraine and Romania.

Name
 is a colloquial and humorous label for a child, especially for a boy.

History
Brand's origins go back to 1977, when the "Smyk" Department Store was established in modernist building of former Central Department Store, which since then has begun to be known and referred to as the 'Smyk'. Later the brand expanded and eventually opened shops abroad in Ukraine and Germany (2006), Russia (2008) and Romania (2009). 
In 2016 Smyk Group was acquisitioned by Bridgepoint.

Notes

References

External links
 Online store (in Polish)
 SMYK Group website (in English)

Polish brands